was a professional Go player.

Biography 
Miyamoto became a professional in 1950 for the Kansai Ki-in. He was promoted to 9 dan in 1969. He is famous for the books he has written. Oyama Kunio, Ushinohama Satsuo and Matsumura Osamu are his disciples.

Titles

References

External links
GoBase Profile
Sensei's Library Profile

1934 births
2012 deaths
Japanese Go players
Go (game) writers